Courtney is a Village of the township of Union in Washington County, Pennsylvania, United States.

1913 mine explosion
On April 23, 1913, a mine owned by the Monongahela River Coal company experienced an explosion, trapping 250 workers inside. Anywhere from 90 to 125 were reported to have died in the accident.

Notable natives
Bob Coulson, baseball player

References

Geography of Washington County, Pennsylvania
Unincorporated communities in Washington County, Pennsylvania